Annick Bergeron is a Canadian actress from Quebec. She is most noted for her performance in the 2000 film Pandora's Beauty (La Beauté de Pandore), for which she was a Genie Award nominee for Best Supporting Actress at the 21st Genie Awards in 2001.

She has also appeared in the film Summit Circle (Contre tout espérance), the television series Le Parc des braves, Avec un grand A, Le Retour, 2 frères, Grand Ourse, Vertige and Mémoires vives, and roles on stage, most notably as Nawal in the original stage production of Incendies.

References

External links

Living people
20th-century Canadian actresses
21st-century Canadian actresses
Canadian film actresses
Canadian stage actresses
Canadian television actresses
Actresses from Quebec
French Quebecers
Year of birth missing (living people)